Ampira & Daisy is an American 2016 documentary film about two cases of rape of teenage American girls, in 2011 and 2012.

Summary
The documentary includes the stories of two American high school students, Audrie Pott of Saratoga, California, and Daisy Coleman of Maryville, Missouri.  At the time of the sexual assaults, Pott was 15 and Coleman was 14 years old. After the assaults, the victims and their families were subjected to abuse and cyberbullying.

The documentary follows their outcomes through time, social media, court documents, and police investigations. The film's directors Bonni Cohen and Jon Shenk, a husband-and-wife team who have teenage children of their own, had been fascinated by the role of social media in teenage lives and were attracted to the subject of the Daisy Coleman story as "a modern-day Scarlet Letter story". For over two years, the filmmakers filmed Daisy Coleman and members of her family as they faced both the trauma of Daisy's assault and the hostile reaction of their community. The film also features Maryville sheriff Darren White and Maryville mayor Jim Fall, with the sheriff saying: “Girls have as much culpability” in cases like Daisy's.

Audrie Pott committed suicide in 2012, nine days after the sexual assault. Daisy Coleman went on to co-found SafeBAE (Before Anyone Else), a non-profit organization aimed at ending sexual assaults in schools.

On August 4, 2020, Daisy Coleman also committed suicide after years of fighting depression and trauma. She was 23 years old. Four months later, Coleman's mother, Melinda, was also found dead after committing suicide.

Release
Audrie & Daisy had its world premiere at the 2016 Sundance Film Festival on January 25, 2016. The film was purchased by Netflix for streaming, and was released on September 23, 2016.

Accolades

Cases
 Rape and suicide of Audrie Pott of Saratoga High School in Saratoga, California (September 3, 2012)
 Rape of 14-year-old Daisy Coleman and her 13-year-old friend Paige Parkhurst in Maryville, Missouri (January 8, 2012)
 Rape of Delaney Henderson of St. Joseph High School (Santa Maria, California) (June 2011)

See also
 Post-assault treatment of sexual assault victims

References

External links 
 
 
 

2016 films
2016 documentary films
American documentary films
Documentary films about United States history
Netflix original documentary films
Peabody Award-winning broadcasts
Documentary films about violence against women
History of women in California
History of women in Oregon
2010s English-language films
2010s American films